The 2000 Stanford Cardinal football team represented Stanford University in the 2000 NCAA Division I-A football season. The team was led by head coach Tyrone Willingham.

Schedule

Game Summaries

at Washington State

San Jose State

No. 5 Texas

Arizona

at No. 25 Notre Dame

at No. 23 Oregon State

USC

No. 9 Washington

at UCLA

Arizona State

at California

Coaching staff

Tyrone Willingham – Head coach
Bill Diedrick – Offensive coordinator and quarterbacks
Buzz Preston – Running backs
Mose Rison – wide receivers
Tom Brattan – Offensive line (centers and guards)
Chuck Moller – Tight ends and offensive line (tackles)
Kent Baer – Defensive coordinator and linebackers
Phil Zacharias – Defensive ends and special teams coordinator
Denny Schuler – Defensive backs
Dave Tipton – Recruiting coordinator

References

Stanford
Stanford Cardinal football seasons
Stanford Cardinal football